Philodromus spectabilis is a species of running crab spider in the family Philodromidae. It is found in the USA and Canada.

References

spectabilis
Articles created by Qbugbot
Spiders described in 1880